Dutton  may refer to:

Places 
In Canada
Dutton/Dunwich, Ontario, town and municipality in Canada
Dutton, Ontario

In the United Kingdom
Dutton, Cheshire, village in England
Dutton, Lancashire, village in England

In the United States
Dutton, Alabama, town 
Dutton, Illinois, ghost town
Dutton, Michigan
Dutton, Montana, town in the United States
Dutton, Nevada, ghost town
Mount Dutton, Alaska

In Australia
Dutton, South Australia
Mount Dutton Bay Conservation Park

People with the surname 
Brian Dutton (born 1985), English footballer
Charles Boydell Dutton (1834–1904), pastoralist and politician in Queensland, Australia
Charles Christian Dutton (died 1842), South Australian pioneer, uncle of C. B. Dutton, disappeared presumed murdered
Charles S. Dutton (born 1951), American actor
Clarence Dutton (1841–1912), American geologist and US Army officer
Denis Dutton (1944–2010), philosopher
Edward Dutton, 4th Baron Sherborne (1831–1919), British peer and diplomat
Emily Dutton (1884–1962), musician, pastoralist and socialite of South Australia, wife of Henry Hampden Dutton
Francis Dutton (1818–1877), Premier of South Australia
Frank Dutton, South African policeman
Frederick Hansborough Dutton (1812–1890), South Australian pastoralist and politician
Geoffrey Piers Henry Dutton (1922–1998), South Australian poet, author, and historian
George Brintnall Dutton (1818-1898), American businessman and politician
Hampden Dutton (1805–1849), pastoralist in New South Wales and South Australia
Henry Dutton (politician) (1796–1869), American politician and the 38th Governor of Connecticut
Henry Dutton (cricketer) (1847–1935), English batsman
Henry Dutton (pastoralist) (1844–1914), South Australian pastoralist, the "Squire of Anlaby"
Henry Hampden Dutton (1879–1932), South Australian pastoralist and pioneer motorist
James Dutton (disambiguation), several people
John Dutton (disambiguation), several people
Joseph Dutton, American Servant of God and worker with lepers
Kevin Dutton  (born 1967), British psychologist and writer, specialising in psychopathy
Lawrence Dutton (born 1954), American violinist
Peter Dutton (born 1970), Australian politician
Phillip Dutton (born 1963), Olympic gold medal equestrian rider
Sir Piers Dutton (died 1545), English knight
Ray Dutton (born 1945), British rugby league footballer
Red Dutton (1898–1987), former NHL President
Reginald J. G. Dutton (1886–1970), English inventor of Dutton Speedwords
Robert Dutton (born 1950), American politician
Rollin Josiah Dutton (1884-1955), American businessman and politician
Simon Dutton (born 1958), British actor, played Simon Templar (alias The Saint) in a series of Australian TV films in 1989
Sir Thomas Dutton (1421–1459), English knight
Thomas Dutton, American musician, lead vocalist of Forgive Durden
Tom Dutton (American football) (1893-1969), US college footballer
Tom Dutton (linguist) (born 1935), Australian linguist
Tim Dutton (born 1964), British actor
Valerie Dutton (also known as Valerie Hollister; born 1939), American painter
William Dutton (captain) (1811–1878), "William Pelham Dutton", whaler and settler of Portland, Victoria
Zachary Dutton, American physicist

People with the given name 
Dutton S. Peterson (1894–1964), New York clergyman and politician

Other uses 
E. P. Dutton, an American book publishing company, since 1986 split into two imprints:
Dutton Penguin
Dutton Children's Books
Dutton Vocalion recordings
Dutton Cars, British company who manufactured kit cars between 1970 and 1989
Dutton Speedwords, an auxiliary language and shorthand writing system
USS Dutton, Ships of the US Navy

English-language surnames